"" ("The Great Charlemagne") is the national anthem of the Principality of Andorra. Enric Marfany Bons composed the music, while the lyrics were authored by Joan Benlloch i Vivó, written in a first-person narrative from the point of view of Andorra. It was adopted as the national anthem on 8 September 1921, which is also the national day of Andorra. The lyrics make reference to several key aspects of Andorran culture and history, such as the heritage of the Carolingian Empire.

History
"El Gran Carlemany" was composed by Enric Marfany Bons (1871–1942), who was a priest. The lyrics to the song were penned by Juan Benlloch i Vivó (1864–1926), who served as the Bishop of Urgell from 1906 to 1919. This position also made him an ex officio Co–Prince of Andorra. The song was officially designated as the country's national anthem on 8 September 1921, when it was sung at the country's cathedral for the first time.  The day it was adopted – 8 September – is the National Day of Andorra.  This coincides with the feast day of Our Lady of Meritxell, the country's patron saint, who is mentioned in the lyrics.

Lyrics
The lyrics of "El Gran Carlemany" give a short account of Andorra's history "in a first-person narrative". It recounts the traditional Andorran legend that Charlemagne reconquered the region from the Moors between 788 and 790, after the Catalan people had guided his army through the rugged valleys, which Charlemagne compensated with granting Andorra its independence, and its first borders were delineated that same year. It formed part of the Marca Hispanica, a buffer zone formed by Charlemagne in order to protect his state (the Carolingian Empire). According to legend, he was responsible for restructuring the country, reintroducing Christianity to its people and overseeing the construction of monasteries. Because of these accomplishments, he was given "a mythical aura" and is regarded as the founder of Andorra.

The hymn begins with "" ("Great Charlemagne my father") and memorialises this view and celebrates the country's status as "the only remaining daughter of the Carolingian empire", since it is the only remnant of the Marca Hispanica.

Notes

References

External links
Recording by the New Japan Philharmonic (former linked source stale.)

European anthems
National symbols of Andorra
Andorran songs
20th-century establishments in Andorra
Cultural depictions of Charlemagne
1921 songs
National anthems
Songs about kings
Songs about emperors
National anthem compositions in G major